Tevin Brown (born September 23, 1998) is an American professional basketball player for the Fort Wayne Mad Ants of the NBA G League. He played college basketball for the Murray State Racers of the Ohio Valley Conference (OVC).

High school career
Brown played basketball for Fairhope High School in Fairhope, Alabama. As a junior, he averaged 24 points and 11 rebounds per game, and was named Coastal Alabama Player of the Year by AL.com. In his senior season, Brown averaged 22 points, 11 rebounds and 4.1 assists per game. He committed to playing college basketball for Murray State, choosing the Racers over Florida Gulf Coast, Illinois State, Little Rock, Middle Tennessee and Old Dominion.

College career
Brown redshirted his first season at Murray State after suffering a left foot injury. On January 10, 2019, he recorded a career-high 31 points, shooting 9-of-14 from three-point range, in a 98–77 win against UT Martin. As a freshman, Brown averaged 11.8 points, 4.7 rebounds and 2.3 assists per game. He assumed a leading role in his sophomore season with the departure of Ja Morant. On December 21, 2019, Brown scored 31 points, matching his career-high, in a 78–76 overtime loss against Evansville. As a sophomore, he averaged 17.9 points, 4.6 rebounds and 3.7 assists per game, and was named to the First Team All-Ohio Valley Conference (OVC). In his junior season, Brown averaged 14.7 points, 5.9 rebounds and 4.3 assists per game, repeating as a First Team All-OVC selection. As a senior, Brown was named to the First Team All-OVC. He averaged 16.8 points, 5.6 rebounds and 3.1 assists per game as a senior.

Professional career
After going undrafted in the 2022 NBA draft, Brown played for the Indiana Pacers in the NBA Summer League. He signed with the Pacers on October 14, 2022, and was waived the next day. He subsequently joined the Fort Wayne Mad Ants of the NBA G League for the 2022–23 season.

On March 17, 2023, Brown signed with the Canterbury Rams for the 2023 New Zealand NBL season.

Career statistics

College

|-
| style="text-align:left;"| 2017–18
| style="text-align:left;"| Murray State
| style="text-align:center;" colspan="11"|  Redshirt
|-
| style="text-align:left;"| 2018–19
| style="text-align:left;"| Murray State
| 33 || 33 || 32.8 || .414 || .372 || .809 || 4.7 || 2.3 || 1.1 || .6 || 11.8
|-
| style="text-align:left;"| 2019–20
| style="text-align:left;"| Murray State
| 32 || 32 || 37.4 || .447 || .419 || .737 || 4.6 || 3.7 || 1.2 || .4 || 17.9
|-
| style="text-align:left;"| 2020–21
| style="text-align:left;"| Murray State
| 26 || 26 || 35.6 || .422 || .372 || .721 || 5.9 || 4.3 || 1.4 || .6 || 14.7
|-
| style="text-align:left;"| 2021–22
| style="text-align:left;"| Murray State
| 34 || 34 || 35.2 || .427 || .384 || .748 || 5.6 || 3.1 || 1.4 || .6 || 16.8
|- class="sortbottom"
| style="text-align:center;" colspan="2"| Career
| 125 || 125 || 35.2 || .428 || .386 || .746 || 5.2 || 3.3 || 1.3 || .5 || 15.3

References

External links
NBA G League profile
Murray State Racers bio

1998 births
Living people
American men's basketball players
Basketball players from Alabama
Fort Wayne Mad Ants players
Murray State Racers men's basketball players
People from Fairhope, Alabama
Shooting guards